The Yuanshui River is a 279-km-long tributary of the Gan River in western Jiangxi province of China. It rises on the Mount Wugong and  flows generally from west to east across Luxi、Yichun、Fenyi、Xinyu and joins Gan River at Zhangshu.

Notes

Rivers of Jiangxi